Deputy Marshal is a 1949 American Western film directed by William Berke and starring Jon Hall, Frances Langford and Dick Foran.

The film was a more expensive production that usual from Robert L. Lippert who originally hoped for Rod Cameron or George Montgomery.

Plot
A lawman (Jon Hall) tracks bank robbers to Wyoming and gets wind of railroad-land scam.

Cast
 Jon Hall as Deputy Ed Garry
 Frances Langford as Janet Masters
 Dick Foran as Joel Benton/Jed Northey
 Julie Bishop as Claire Benton
 Joe Sawyer as Eli Cressett/Colt Redword
 Russell Hayden as Bill Masters
 Clem Bevans as Doc Allen Vinson
 Vince Barnett as Hotel Desk Clark
 Mary Gordon as Mrs. Lance
 Stanley Blystone as Leo Harrold
 Keene Duncan as Cal Freelong
 Roy Butler as Deputy Sheriff Weed Toler
 Wheaton Chambers as Harley Masters
 Forrest Taylor as Sheriff Jeff Lance

Production
Filming started 6 July 1949.

References

External links
 
 Deputy Marshal at IMDb

1949 films
1949 Western (genre) films
American Western (genre) films
American black-and-white films
1940s English-language films
Films directed by William A. Berke
Lippert Pictures films
1940s American films